Stauntonia is a genus of flowering plants in the family Lardizabalaceae. It is named after George Staunton, who brought it to Britain from China in the 19th century.

Species
Species accepted by the Plants of the World Online as of March 2023:

Stauntonia angustifolia 
Stauntonia brachyandra 
Stauntonia brunoniana 
Stauntonia cavalerieana 
Stauntonia chapaensis 
Stauntonia chinensis 
Stauntonia conspicua 
Stauntonia coriacea 
Stauntonia crassifolia 
Stauntonia decora 
Stauntonia duclouxii 
Stauntonia filamentosa 
Stauntonia grandiflora 
Stauntonia hexaphylla 
Stauntonia latifolia 
Stauntonia libera 
Stauntonia linearifolia 
Stauntonia maculata 
Stauntonia medogensis 
Stauntonia obcordatilimba 
Stauntonia obovata 
Stauntonia obovatifoliola 
Stauntonia oligophylla 
Stauntonia parviflora 
Stauntonia pterocaulis 
Stauntonia purpurea 
Stauntonia trinervia 
Stauntonia yaoshanensis

References

Bibliography

Lardizabalaceae
Ranunculales genera